Rainbow is a 1978 American made-for-television biographical musical drama film which chronicles the early years of singer-actress Judy Garland, portrayed by Andrea McArdle. Directed by Jackie Cooper, it was written by John McGreevey based on the 1975 book Rainbow: The Stormy Life of Judy Garland by Christopher Finch. It originally aired on NBC Monday Night at the Movies on November 6, 1978. The casting of McArdle as Judy Garland was heavily criticized at the time, as the actress did not resemble nor sound remotely like Garland.

Synopsis
The early life and struggles of Judy Garland during her early years in vaudeville, and follows her through her illustrious and highly-publicized rise to stardom at Metro-Goldwyn-Mayer studios; her trials as a youngster in dealing with the movie studio system that held her back while her mother was forever pushing her to excel, as well as all the backstage joy and heartbreak during the filming of The Wizard of Oz (1939).

Cast
Andrea McArdle as Judy Garland
Don Murray as Frank Gumm
Michael Parks as Roger Edens
Piper Laurie as Ethel Gumm
Rue McClanahan as Ida Koverman
Jack Carter as George Jessel
Nicholas Pryor as Bill Gilmore
Donna Pescow as Jimmie Gumm
Martin Balsam as Louis B. Mayer
Johnny Doran as Jackie Cooper

Award
Emmy Award
 1979: Primetime Emmy Award for Outstanding Cinematography for a Limited Series or a Special – Howard Schwartz

External links

Cultural depictions of Judy Garland
1978 television films
1978 films
1970s biographical drama films
1970s musical drama films
American biographical drama films
American musical drama films
Biographical television films
NBC network original films
Films based on biographies
Films set in the 1920s
Films set in the 1930s
Films about actors
Films about singers
Films directed by Jackie Cooper
Films scored by Charles Fox
American drama television films
1970s English-language films
1970s American films